Arja Sinikka Juvonen (born 8 December 1967) is a Finnish politician who represents the conservative Finns Party in the Parliament of Finland.

Career 
Juvonen served in the city council of Espoo since 2009 and in 2011 was elected to represent the Uusimaa constituency in the Parliament of Finland.

In 2017, Juvonen left the Finns Party due to the election of the Jussi Halla-aho as the leader of the party. However, she did not join the Blue Reform party, which was formed by the MPs that had left the Finns Party. Instead, after a few weeks, Juvonen re-joined the Finns Party.

In May 2020, Juvonen publicly criticized the government's response to the COVID-19 pandemic in Finland, arguing that the government was not prepared to response to the pandemic.

References

1967 births
Living people
People from Kuopio
Finns Party politicians
Members of the Parliament of Finland (2011–15)
Members of the Parliament of Finland (2015–19)
Members of the Parliament of Finland (2019–23)
21st-century Finnish women politicians
Women members of the Parliament of Finland